Zoran Milanović has served as the 5th President of Croatia since 19 February 2020. During this time period he has conducted 3 official, state and working visits to a total of 3 foreign countries.

Countries visited by Zoran Milanović by number of visits until :

One visit: Bulgaria (planned), Estonia (planned), Germany (planned), Montenegro
Two visits: Austria (one held, one planned)
Three visits: Slovenia (two held, one planned)

Realized trips

2020

Planned trips

Cancelled trips

See also

List of state visits made by Kolinda Grabar-Kitarović, President of Croatia (2015–2020)

References

Milanović
Milanović
Milanović